Damnation Festival is an annual one-day heavy metal music festival currently held at Bowlers Exhibition Centre in Manchester. It was held at Jilly's Rockworld in Manchester from 2005 to 2006 and then University of Leeds from 2007 until 2021. It is organised by Gavin McInally and Paul Farrington.

Damnation 2005

The first Damnation Festival was held on 16 October 2005 at Jillys Rockworld, Manchester, England. There were fifteen bands over two stages, headlined by Raging Speedhorn and Entombed. Tickets for the inaugural festival were priced at £13.

Damnation 2006

The second annual Damnation Festival was held on 15 October 2006 at Jillys Rockworld, Manchester, England. There were fourteen bands over two stages, headlined by The Haunted and Akercocke. Tickets for the festival were priced at £15.

Damnation 2007

The third annual Damnation Festival was held on 20 October 2007 and saw the festival move to a new venue at Leeds Metropolitan University, Leeds, England. There were eighteen bands over two stages, headlined by Kreator and Anaal Nathrakh. Tickets for the festival were priced at £22.

Damnation 2008

The fourth annual Damnation Festival was held on 22 November 2008 and saw the festival move to another new venue at University of Leeds, Leeds, England. The change of venues allowed the festival to expand to three stages incorporating seventeen bands with headliners Carcass, Cathedral and Pitchshifter. Tickets for the festival were priced at £29.

British band Raging Speedhorn were initially booked to play the festival in what would be their last show, however they later cancelled to take on a more lucrative final tour in Japan. Carcass would make this show their only UK show on their comeback tour.

Damnation 2009
The fifth annual Damnation Festival was held on 24 October 2009 at University of Leeds, Leeds, England. The organizers have announced the festival would again cover three stages but open doors earlier to allow for more bands and less clashes across the stages. Headline acts for 2009 were Life of Agony, Lock Up and Jesu.

Life of Agony's headline slot was their only UK appearance in 2009.

This appearance was Mistress's last show and Rotting Christ's only English show for 2009.

Negura Bunget and Extreme Noise Terror were originally booked to play the Terrorizer stage but both had to pull out. Negura Bunget played a make up set in May 2010 at sister festival Deathfest.

On 3 June Entombed were announced on the festival line up. On 23 June the bands management issued a statement announcing that the band would not appear at the festival.

Damnation 2010
The sixth annual Damnation Festival was held on 6 November 2010 at University of Leeds, Leeds, England. Again the festival covered three stages. The Dillinger Escape Plan and Paradise Lost co-headlined the Jägermeister Stage, whilst Discharge headlined the Terrorizer stage and Alcest the Rock Sound Stage. Early bird ticket prices were £19 and full price tickets £27.

 Festival organisers ran competitions to determine the opening bands for each of the three stages. The Construct won the competition for the Rock Sound stage 45% of the total 4000 votes cast.
 The competition for the terrorizer stage ended in a dead heat and both Diascorium and Colonel Blast were given opening slots on the stage.
 Mutant won the competition for the opening slot of the Jägermeister Stage.

Damnation 2011
The seventh annual Damnation Festival was held on 5 November 2011 at University of Leeds, Leeds, England. Again the festival covered three stages, with headliners Devin Townsend Project, Ulver and God is an Astronaut.

Early bird tickets went on sale in December 2010 for £19.50 and full price tickets £29. Decapitated were forced to pull out after surviving a plane crash. Returning from their US tour, the plane was forced to make a landing with no landing gear in their native Poland.

Damnation 2012
The Eighth annual Damnation Festival was held across three stages at the University of Leeds student union, Leeds, England, on Saturday 3 November.

Damnation 2013
The ninth annual Damnation Festival was held across four stages at the University of Leeds student union, Leeds, England, on Saturday 2 November. The event was headlined by Carcass in their only UK headlining show of 2013 following the release of their new album.

Damnation 2014
The 10th Damnation Festival was held at Leeds University Union on Saturday 1 November and featured a total of 26 bands across four stages. The sold out event saw a crowd of approximately 4000 in attendance.

Headliners for the event were UK death-metal act Bolt Thrower who played their only UK performance for 2014 at the festival. October File were booked to play the festival but were forced to withdraw prior to the event, they were replaced by Dyscarnate.

Damnation 2015
The 11th Damnation Festival was held at Leeds University Union on Saturday 7 November and featured a total of 27 bands across four stages. The event was headlined by At the Gates.

Damnation 2016

Damnation 2017

Damnation 2018

Damnation 2019

Damnation 2020 
Damnation festival was forced to be cancel in 2020 due to ongoing regulations around music venues during the COVID-19 pandemic.

Damnation 2021 
Green Lung were originally booked to play the Eyesore Merch Stage but had to pull out due to a member of the band testing positive for Covid-19. They were replaced by Svalbard.

Damnation 2022 

The festival was held at the Bowlers Exhibition Centre in Manchester for the first time. The festival is now the largest indoor metal festival in Europe. Ministry (band) were originally booked to headline the festival but pulled out due to the cancellation of their European tour. Godflesh were announced as the replacement as well as four exclusive full album performances:

 Converge - Jane Doe
 At The Gates - Slaughter Of The Soul
 Godflesh - Streetcleaner
 Pig Destroyer - Prowler In The Yard

References

External links

Official MySpace

Heavy metal festivals in the United Kingdom
Music festivals in Leeds
Music festivals established in 2005
2005 establishments in England